Hindumanes karnatakaensis is a species of spider in the family Salticidae, found in India.

References

Salticidae
Spiders of the Indian subcontinent
Spiders described in 1978